Vršna Vas is a dispersed settlement in the hills south of Šmarje pri Jelšah in eastern Slovenia. The area is part of Styria and is included in the Savinja Statistical Region. It is a scattered village on a ridge and slope on either side of Zibika Creek. It includes the hamlets of Planinca and Sveta Magdalena.

Name
The name of the settlement was changed from Sveta Magdalena pri Zibikih (literally, 'Saint Mary Magdalene near Zibika') to Vršna vas (literally, 'peak village') in 1955. The name was changed on the basis of the 1948 Law on Names of Settlements and Designations of Squares, Streets, and Buildings as part of efforts by Slovenia's postwar communist government to remove religious elements from toponyms. Before Vršna vas became the name of the entire settlement, the name used to refer to one of the hamlets in the settlement.

Notable people
Notable people that were born or lived in Vršna Vas include:
Jakob Palir (1866–1957), religious writer and editor

References

External links
Vršna Vas at Geopedia

Populated places in the Municipality of Šmarje pri Jelšah